Michael d'Orlando (born March 6, 2002) is an American racing driver who competes in the 2023 USF Pro 2000 Championship driving for Turn 3 Motorsport. He is the 2022 USF2000 champion.

Career

Formula 4 United States Championship 
On July 26, 2019, it was announced that d'Orlando would compete in the Formula 4 United States Championship with Velocity Racing Development starting at the third round at Virginia International Raceway. He would end up with a third place finish at the final race at Circuit of the Americas.

U.S. F2000 National Championship 
After a brief stint in the U.S. F2000 National Championship in 2018 with Team Benik, d'Orlando announced on March 3, 2020, that he would return to the series for the full 2020 season and drive for Cape Motorsports. He won his first race at Mid-Ohio and finished 4th in the standings.  

On February 17, 2021, d'Orlando confirmed that he would return to the championship with Cape Motorsports for the 2021 season. He won three races that season and finished 2nd in the championship. 

d'Orlando would return to the series for a fourth year in 2022 once again with Cape Motorsports. He would compete for the championship all season with competitors Myles Rowe and Jace Denmark. The title would be decided at the final round at Portland. d'Orlando would win the final race of the season which allowed him to win the 2022 championship.

Racing record

Career summary 

* Season still in progress.

American open-wheel racing results

U.S. F2000 National Championship 
(key) (Races in bold indicate pole position) (Races in italics indicate fastest lap) (Races with * indicate most race laps led)

References 

2002 births
Living people
Racing drivers from New York City
U.S. F2000 National Championship drivers
Team Pelfrey drivers
United States F4 Championship drivers